The Alberta Pensions Services Corporation (APS) is a Crown corporation responsible for providing pension benefit administration services for public-sector employees in Alberta, Canada. Based in Edmonton, APS administers seven statutory public sector pension plans and two supplementary retirement plans on behalf of the Government of Alberta.

References

External links

Crown corporations of Alberta
Companies based in Edmonton
Financial services companies established in 1995
1995 establishments in Alberta